The North of England and South of England cricket teams appeared in first-class cricket between the 1836 and 1961 seasons, most often in matches against each other but also individually in games against touring teams, Marylebone Cricket Club (MCC) and others. Until international cricket became firmly established towards the end of the 19th century, the North v South match was one of the major fixtures in the cricketing calendar along with Gentlemen v Players. Indeed it was really the major fixture because whereas the Gentlemen teams were often very weak, North v South could potentially showcase the best 22 players in the country. In all, the North played against the South 155 times in first-class matches.

Early matches – 1836 to 1838
Cricket in the 18th century had been predominantly a southern game, played especially in London and the southeastern counties. It had spread to the northern counties by the 1770s and noted clubs were formed at Manchester, Nottingham and Sheffield which eventually became the basis of county cricket in the north. In the 1820s, a number of northern players such as Sam Redgate, Tom Marsden, Thomas Barker and James Dearman established reputations which made cricket promoters aware of commercial possibilities in a North v South fixture.

The inaugural North v South match was held at Lord's Cricket Ground on 11 and 12 July 1836 and the North won by 6 wickets to confirm their capability and potential. Barker took ten wickets in the match and scored the most runs with 25 and 12 not out. The North's victory caused a sensation and a return match was quickly organised. This took place at Barker's Ground in Leicester and the South won by 218 runs. Redgate for the North and William Lillywhite for the South took twelve and eleven wickets in the match respectively, but the outstanding performance was an innings of 125 not out by Alfred Mynn despite a serious leg injury sustained in practice. His condition worsened as the match went on and he had to withdraw. With insufficient medical resources locally, Mynn was lifted onto the roof of a stagecoach and secured there to be taken to London, where he was admitted to St Bartholomew's Hospital. The surgeon considered amputation but decided against it and Mynn was able to resume his cricket career in July 1838. Mynn's injury raised the issue of leg guards which were generally frowned upon at the time, but the legalisation of roundarm bowling in 1835 meant that bowling was much faster than formerly and, gradually, pads were introduced.

The next two North v South games took place in 1837 and 1838 and were won convincingly by the South. Interest faded and the fixture disappeared for eleven years until it was resurrected in the 1849 season. In the meantime (1840–48), the North played annual matches against Marylebone Cricket Club (MCC). A feature of North v South from the beginning was that players could represent either team depending on current residency or being "borderline", thus a player living in the Midlands might well change sides often. In the first four games alone, no less than six players represented both sides. The total appearances by players in the 1836 to 1838 matches were:
 4 – Ned Wenman, Fuller Pilch, George Jarvis, George Millyard, James Cobbett, Sam Redgate, Thomas Barker, Tom Marsden
 3 – Emmanuel Vincent, William Lillywhite, James Dearman, James Taylor, Thomas Beagley, Thomas Box, William Clifford, William Garrat
 2 – Alfred Mynn, Bartholomew Good, Charles Creswell, Francis Fenner, George Rothera, Jem Broadbridge, Richard Mills, Tom Adams, William Hillyer
 1 – Arthur Rich, Daniel Hayward, Edward Grimston, Frederick Ponsonby, Henry Hall, John Bayley, John Gibson, Joe Guy, John Wenman, Thomas Heath, William Clarke, William Dorrinton, William Ward, Will Caldecourt

An annual event
From 1849, the match became virtually an annual fixture and was often contested two or three times in the same season. It was played four times in 1878. The revival was at Lord's on 16 and 17 July 1849 when the North won by 243 runs after William Clarke and John Wisden dismissed the South for 48 and 67.

There was a change to the fixture's naming convention between 1866 and 1868 when the River Thames became the dividing line and the teams were called North of the Thames and South of the Thames. This effectively restricted the South's catchment to the counties of Hampshire, Kent, Surrey and Sussex.

North v South continued annually through to 1897 but was not held in either 1898 or 1899. It was revived in September 1900 when two matches were played, both at southern venues.

United Elevens
During the 1870s the fixture received competition in the shape of matches between the equivalent professional touring teams, the United North of England Eleven and the United South of England Eleven. There were 11 games involving the United sides and then one (the last) in 1880 when the United South played against the official North. Other variations featured teams called Gentlemen of the North, Gentlemen of the South, Players of the North and Players of the South who played against each other on several occasions.

20th century
The fixture's popularity waned as international cricket expanded and it was played less frequently in the 20th century. Following the two games in September 1900, there were only eight instances between then and September 1920, all of them in the 1904 to 1908 period. Between the two world wars, there were eleven matches. The fixture was resurrected in 1946 after the end of the Second World War and, except for 1953, was played annually, sometimes more than once a season, through to 1958. Then there was a three-year hiatus until the final first-class match took place 6 to 8 September 1961 at Stanley Park, Blackpool, the South winning by two wickets. The fixture was finally ended by the advent of limited overs cricket, which left no space for it in an already crowded calendar. The last North v South contest of the 20th century was a one-day 50 over match at Trent Bridge in the 1971 season, which the South won by 9 runs.

Revival
Three game series, in 50-over One Day International format, were held in the United Arab Emirates in March 2017 and in Barbados in March 2018 as part of the English county cricket pre-season schedule.

List of North v South first-class matches

References

Bibliography
 
 
 

First-class cricket matches
English domestic cricket competitions
English cricket in the 19th century